Trafalgar is a seaside resort village in Ugu District Municipality in the KwaZulu-Natal province of South Africa. Trafalgar is on the north bank of the Mpenjati river which enters the Indian Ocean at the Mpenjati Nature Reserve.  The beach at Mpenjati Nature Reserve has been used by naturists for many years.

References

Nude beaches
Populated coastal places in South Africa
Populated places in the Ray Nkonyeni Local Municipality
KwaZulu-Natal South Coast